The House by the Lake is a 1956 British stage thriller in three acts, by Hugh Mills.  The main characters are Maurice and Stella, a brother and sister who plot to murder their unlikeable brother, Colin. The other characters include Maurice's wife, Janet, Colin's long-suffering wife, Iris, and Colonel Forbes, a neighbour.

It premiered in London's West End, where it ran for two years, starring Flora Robson and Andrew Cruickshank; and has since become a staple of amateur dramatics.

Original production
The play, directed by John Fernald, opened at the Duke of York's Theatre on 9 May 1956, with the following cast:

Brenda - 	Doreen Morton
Colin - 	Paul Lee
Colonel Forbes - 	Andrew Laurence
Colonel Forbes - 	Frank Royde
Iris - 	Sylvia Coleridge
Janet Holt - 	Flora Robson
Maurice Holt - 	Andrew Cruickshank
Mr Howard - 	Alan McNaughtan
Mr. Howard - 	Richard Warner
Nurse Thomson - 	Annette Kerr
Stella	- Jenny Laird

The production was designed by Fanny Taylor.

References

1956 plays
British plays
Thriller plays